Nathaniel Johnson (born May 12, 1957) is a former American football wide receiver who played for the New York Giants of the National Football League (NFL). He played college football at the Hillsdale College.

References 

1957 births
Living people
American football wide receivers
Hillsdale Chargers football players
New York Giants players